Allomethus unicicolis is a species of fly in the family Pipunculidae. It was described by Skevington in 2002.

Distribution
Australia.

References

Pipunculidae
Insects described in 2002
Diptera of Australasia